The 1988 Volvo International was a men's tennis tournament played on outdoor hard courts at the Stratton Mountain Resort in Stratton Mountain, Vermont, United States, and was part of the 1988 Nabisco Grand Prix. The tournament ran from July 25 through August 1, 1988. Andre Agassi won the singles title.

Finals

Singles

 Andre Agassi defeated  Paul Annacone 6–2, 6–4
 It was Agassi's 5th singles title of the year and the 6th of his career.

Doubles

 Jorge Lozano /  Todd Witsken defeated  Pieter Aldrich /  Danie Visser 6–3, 7–6
 It was Lozano's 4th title of the year and the 4th of his career. It was Witsken's 4th title of the year and the 4th of his career.

References

External links
 ITF tournament edition details

 
Volvo International
Volvo International
Volvo International
Volvo International
Volvo International